Jacob James Grady (born February 26, 1992), better known by the stage name Scarlet Envy, is an American drag queen, reality television personality, singer, and performer who came to international attention on the eleventh season of RuPaul's Drag Race.

Early life
James was raised in Louisville, Kentucky, by two mothers, both named Sherri. During childhood, he ran cross country for 12 years. In 2014, he graduated from the Fashion Institute of Technology with a degree in advertising design.

Career
Scarlet Envy first started drag in college, entering a drag pageant, where she learned that she doesn't have the typical drag skills of dancing and pageantry. This experience, and having drag queen friends, ignited her drag career. She has credited her successful career to persistence, energy, and acceptance. Envy is the drag daughter of Drag Race season 7 finalist Pearl.

In 2017, Scarlet Envy played the title role of Yma Sumac in the production of The Legend of Yma Sumac at The Laurie Beechman Theatre in New York City. She was also featured on the season finale of Saturday Night Live as a performer for Katy Perry's single "Swish Swish", alongside other RuPaul's Drag Race contestants Yuhua Hamasaki, Vivacious, and Brita Filter.

After auditioning four times, Scarlet Envy was cast on the eleventh season of Drag Race in 2018. She won the second episode's challenge along with Yvie Oddly. She won the mini challenge in Episode 4, participated in a six-way lip sync on episode 3, and was eliminated on episode 6, losing the lip sync to Ra'Jah O'Hara. Scarlet Envy returned for the sixth season of RuPaul's Drag Race: All Stars, which began airing on June 24, 2021.  Envy placed safe in the first 4 episodes, until she was eliminated in the fifth episode by Ginger Minj, placing 9th overall.

On June 20, 2019, Scarlet Envy self-released the single "Feeling Is Mutual". The title of the song is based on her Drag Race entrance line, "The world wants me, and the feeling is mutual."

Personal life
James lived in New York City, from 2019 to 2022. She moved to Los Angeles in November 2022.

Discography
Singles

Filmography

Television

Web series

Theatre

References

External links 

 Jacob James at IMDb

1992 births
Living people
American drag queens
Fashion Institute of Technology alumni
People from Louisville, Kentucky
RuPaul's Drag Race contestants
People from New York City
RuPaul's Drag Race All Stars contestants